José 'The Devil's Advocate' Reis (born 30 June 1977) is a Portuguese Muay Thai kickboxer of Cape Verdean descent fighting out of Lisbon, Portugal for Olival Gym at either welterweight or super middleweight.  He is the 2010 W.F.C.A. Full Contact world champion and a x2 K-1 MAX regional champion who has fought for both the K-1 MAX and SuperLeague organizations.  His younger brother, Luis Reis, is also a successful kickboxer.

Biography and career 

In his early years José had a successful spell as an amateur winning three Iberian championships and a gold medal in the I.M.T.F. European championships as well as a number of bronze medals in various W.A.K.O. and I.M.T.F. European/world championships.  In 2002 he won his first professional title at the K-1 Spain MAX 2002, where he defeated Ante Bilić in the final of the eight man tournament.

In 2004 he won his second K-1 MAX tournament, this time in held in Portugal, defeating his own brother Luis in the semi finals.  Despite winning another regional tournament  José would not be given the chance to qualify for the K-1 MAX final.  In 2005 he signed up with the recently created SuperLeague organization and he had ten fights within the organization between 2005 and 2006, winning four and losing six.  His highlight was a runner up position at the SuperLeague Elimination 2006 tournament losing to Jordan Tai in the final. 
  
After the SuperLeague organizations demise at the end of 2006 José won the W.F.C.A. European title and had a spell with the Steko's Fight Night and KlasH promotions, losing out to Yohan Lidon in a fight for the W.K.A. world title.  He also returned to amateur action in 2007, picking up a bronze medal and then a silver the following year at the W.A.K.O. European championships. In 2010 he had his most recent success, defeating Gago Drago via controversial decision to claim the W.F.C.A. world title.

Titles 

Professional
2010 World Full Contact Association (W.F.C.A.) K-1 Rules World champion -72.5 kg
2007 Kings of Kickboxing Karlsruhe runner up -75 kg
2007 W.F.C.A. Thai-boxing European champion -75 kg
2006 Super League Elimination tournament runner up -73 kg
2004 K-1 MAX Portugal tournament champion -70 kg
2002 K-1 Spain MAX tournament champion -70 kg

Amateur
2008 W.A.K.O. European Championships in Porto, Portugal  -75 kg (K-1 Rules)
2007 W.A.K.O. World Championships in Serbia, Belgrade  -75 kg (K-1 Rules)
2002 I.A.M.T.F. Muay Thai European Championships in Caldas da Rainha, Portugal  -71 kg
2002 Iberian Championships 
2001 I.A.M.T.F Muay Thai World Championships in Bangkok, Thailand  -69 kg
2001 W.A.K.O. World Championships in Belgrade, Serbia & Montenegro  -71 kg (Low Kick)
2001 Iberian Championships 
2000 W.A.K.O. European Championships in Moscow, Russia 
2000 Iberian Championships

Professional Kickboxing Record

Amateur Kickboxing Record

See also 
List of K-1 events
List of K-1 champions
List of male kickboxers

References

External links
fighter's profile - Jose Reis | K-1sport.de
José REIS - MUAYTHAITV

1977 births
Living people
Portuguese male kickboxers
Cape Verdean male kickboxers
Middleweight kickboxers
Welterweight kickboxers
Portuguese people of Cape Verdean descent